Game is a 2015 dramatic play written by Mike Bartlett.

Game premiered at the Almeida Theatre in London, England.

Plot
A voyeuristic look at a couple's relationship set in a reality television setting.

Reception
The Observer theatre critic Kate Kellaway wrote, "Game is more a concept than a conventional play, in which multitalented and prolific playwright Mike Bartlett explores the numb thrills of video-game violence and the relationship between virtual assassinations and the extermination of real people in an ingeniously executed evening, directed with sangfroid by Sacha Wares."

References

External links
Game at Almeida Theatre

2015 plays
Plays by Mike Bartlett